This is a list of electoral results for the Electoral district of Adelaide in South Australian state elections from the district's first election in 1938 until the present.

Members for Adelaide

Election results

Elections in the 2020s

Elections in the 2010s

Elections in the 2000s

Elections in the 1990s

Elections in the 1980s

 Adelaide became a notional 2.8 percent Liberal held seat in the redistribution.

Elections in the 1970s

Elections in the 1960s

References 

2002 SA election: Antony Green ABC

South Australian state electoral results by district